This is a list of members of the Tasmanian Legislative Council between 1897 and 1903. Terms of the Legislative Council did not coincide with Legislative Assembly elections, and members served six year terms, with a number of members facing election each year.

Elections

Members

Notes
  In February 1899, James Gibson, the member for South Esk, resigned. Robert Scott was elected unopposed on 16 March 1899.
  In April 1901, Frederick Piesse, the member for Buckingham, resigned. Tetley Gant won the resulting by-election on 7 May 1901.
  On 22 July 1901, John Hair McCall, the member for Mersey, died. John Henry won the resulting by-election on 16 August 1901.
  On 30 September 1901, Charles Henry Grant, one of the three members for Hobart, died. William Gibson won the resulting by-election on 22 October 1901.
  In June 1902, John Henry, the member for Mersey, resigned. Hubert Nichols won the resulting by-election on 18 July 1902.
  In October 1902, William Hart, one of the two members for Launceston, resigned. He was returned unopposed on 26 November 1902.
  On 19 January 1903, William Perkins, the member for Pembroke, died. James Murdoch (senior) was elected unopposed on 7 February 1903.

Sources
 
 Parliament of Tasmania (2006). The Parliament of Tasmania from 1856

Members of Tasmanian parliaments by term
20th-century Australian politicians
19th-century Australian politicians